Tagg may refer to:

People 
 Barclay Tagg (born 1937), American horse trainer 
 Ernie Tagg (1917–2006), English football player
 Mike Tagg (born 1946), English long-distance runner
 Peter Tagg (disambiguation)
 Trixie Tagg, Australian educator, former soccer player and former soccer coach
 Tagg Bozied (born 1979), American baseball player
 Tagg Romney (born 1970), American businessman, son of politician Mitt Romney

Other uses 
 Tagg, in Wolof music an ode of pre-Islamic origin
 TAGG – The Alternative Gig Guide, a free fortnightly Australian music newspaper published from 1979 to 1981
 Tagg's Island, an island in the River Thames, England

See also 
 Tagg Flats, Oklahoma, United States, a census-designated place 
 Tag (disambiguation)

Lists of people by nickname